Manisha Koirala (born 16 August 1970) is a Nepalese actress who works in Indian films, predominantly in Hindi and Tamil films and has also worked in few Telugu, Bengali, Malayalam, Nepali and English films. Known for her work in both commercial and independent cinema, she is the recipient of several accolades, including four Filmfare Awards. In 2001, the Government of Nepal awarded her with the Order of Gorkha Dakshina Bahu, the second highest honor of the country.

Born to the politically prominent Koirala family, she is the daughter of Prakash Koirala and granddaughter of Bishweshwar Prasad Koirala, former Prime Minister of Nepal. Koirala made her acting debut with the Nepali film Pheri Bhetaula (1989), and went on to feature in the Hindi drama Saudagar (1991). Following a series of commercial failures, she established herself as a leading actress with the romantic dramas 1942: A Love Story (1994) and the Tamil-language Bombay (1995). She subsequently starred in a series of commercial successes, including Agni Sakshi (1996), Indian (1996), Gupt: The Hidden Truth (1997), Kachche Dhaage (1999), Mudhalvan (1999), Company (2002)  and  Ek Chhotisi Love Story (2002).

Koirala received critical recognition for her portrayals of characters in varied genres: an ambitious wife in Akele Hum Akele Tum (1995), the daughter of deaf-mute parents in Khamoshi: The Musical (1996), a terrorist in Dil Se.. (1998), a mistreated woman in Lajja (2001) and Sushmita Banerjee in  Escape From Taliban (2003).
Post-2003, Koirala began to work with independent film makers in art-house projects and in regional films. Her performances in the drama Tulsi (2008), the Malayalam psychological drama Elektra (2010), the anthology I Am (2010) and the romantic comedy Mappillai (2011) were praised.

She took a break from acting after being diagnosed with ovarian cancer in 2012 and returned five years later with the coming-of-age drama Dear Maya (2017). The following year, she featured in the Netflix production Lust Stories and the biography Sanju; the latter ranks among the highest-grossing Indian releases. In addition to acting in films, Koirala was appointed as the Goodwill Ambassador for the United Nations Population Fund in 1999 for India and 2015 for Nepal, and was involved in the relief works after the April 2015 Nepal earthquake. She promotes causes such as women's rights, prevention of violence against women, prevention of human trafficking and cancer awareness, contributing as an author to the novel Healed: an account of her struggle with ovarian cancer.

Life and career

1970–1993: Early life and career beginnings
Manisha Koirala was born into the politically prominent Koirala family, in Kathmandu, Nepal. Her father, Prakash Koirala, is a politician, former Cabinet minister and a former member of Nepal’s House of Representatives, while her mother, Sushma Koirala, is a homemaker. She has one brother, Siddharth Koirala, who is a former Bollywood actor. Several members of her family went on to become politicians; her grandfather, Bishweshwar Prasad Koirala, was the Prime Minister of Nepal during the late 1950s to the early 1960s, as were two of her great-uncles, Girija Prasad Koirala and Matrika Prasad Koirala. Koirala spent her early life in India, and she stayed in Varanasi at her maternal grandmother's home for some years and later in Delhi and Mumbai.

While at home in Varanasi, she attended the Vasant Kanya Mahavidyalaya until Class X. During a break after her board exams, Koirala made her acting debut in 1989 with the Nepali film Pheri Bhetaula as an experiment. Aspiring to become a doctor, she moved to Delhi and studied at the Army Public School (APS) of the Dhaula Kuan, New Delhi campus. In an interview, she said that living on her own in Delhi helped her become "strong and independent." In Delhi, Koirala took on a few modeling assignments, but later shifted her focus toward acting. One of these was for a wool company. Determined to pursue a career in acting, Koirala moved to Mumbai for film roles.

She followed this with her Hindi film debut in Subhash Ghai's directorial Saudagar two years later, which emerged as a commercial success. According to Sukanya Verma of Rediff.com, "[C]ritics saw sparks in Manisha, even as she was constantly referred to as Madhuri Dixit's lookalike". Yalgaar (1992), did well at the box-office and was classified as a hit. However, this was trailed by a series of films that performed poorly at the box office, including First Love Letter (1991),  Anmol and Dhanwan (both 1993), which led to Koirala being labeled "a jinx" by producers. Koirala is frequently cited as one of the most beautiful actress of Bollywood. She is credited for such roles as 1942 A Love Story, Akele Hum Akele Tum, Bombay, Agnisakshi, Khamoshi, Gupt, Dil Se and Company.

1994–1996: Breakthrough and stardom
Koirala's career prospects improved after starring in Vidhu Vinod Chopra's romance film 1942: A Love Story (1994), set during the Indian independence movement. She played Rajjo, the daughter of a freedom fighter who falls in love with Naren (Anil Kapoor), the apolitical son of a British colonial employee. Chopra dismissed Koirala as a "terrible actress" after her first screen test, but was impressed with her performance for a second audition and decided to cast her in place of Madhuri Dixit. The film featured the protagonists sharing a deep kiss; it was certified U/A (Parental guidance required) by the Central Board of Film Certification, becoming the first Indian film to receive the rating. Koirala's performance received positive reviews, with critics hailing her as "a sensitive performer".  The film proved to be a box office flop. However, it fetched Koirala her first nomination for Best Actress at the annual Filmfare Awards ceremony.

In 1995, Koirala made her debut in Tamil cinema with the Mani Ratnam-directed political romance Bombay, starring alongside Arvind Swami.  She took up the role on the insistence of her friend  Ashok Mehta, at a time when other contemporaries urged her to not act in non Hindi film industries. It received critical acclaim, with American critic James Berardinelli writing, "Bombay recalls how forceful a motion picture can be. It also reminds us of the maxim that those who don't learn from history are doomed to repeat it". For playing a Muslim who marries a Hindu journalist against the backdrop of the Bombay riots in the eponymous film, Koirala won the Filmfare Critics Award for Best Performance, the only time it was awarded to a recipient for a performance in a non-Hindi film. At the 43rd Filmfare Awards South, she received her first Award in the Best Actress – Tamil category. Koirala's performances in 1942: A Love Story and Bombay proved to be milestones in her career, and established her in the film industry. The same year, she featured in the musical romance Akele Hum Akele Tum opposite  Aamir Khan, for which she received her second nomination in the Best Actress category at the Filmfare Awards.

The following year, she played a battered wife on the run from her mentally-ill husband in the drama Agni Sakshi, a remake of the Julia Roberts-starrer Sleeping with the Enemy (1991), which begot her positive reviews for her performance. The film was released in close succession with two other remakes of the same film–Yaraana (1995) and Daraar (1996). A reviewer for the University of California deemed the film to be superior to the original. In her book Bioscope: A Frivolous History of Bollywood in Ten Chapters, Diptakirti Chaudhuri wrote, "Even in a derivative film like Agni Sakshi, her performance as a tortured wife [is] pitch perfect against the formidable Nana Patekar". The film was a commercial success, emerging as the second highest-grossing film of the year in India. During the film's production, Koirala began dating her co-star Nana Patekar; Patekar confirmed their relationship and eventual breakup in 2003. Physical abuse on his part may have been a factor for their separation.

Koirala next featured opposite Salman Khan in the comedy Majhdhaar the same year, which was both a critical and commercial failure. She then played a starring role in S. Shankar's Indian (1996), which marked her second Tamil film. It was also dubbed and released in Hindi under the title Hindustani. Featuring Kamal Haasan in dual roles alongside Koirala and Urmila Matondkar, it was the most expensive Indian film at that time, with a budget of 150 million. Nirupama Subramanian of India Today felt the film was a commercial potboiler and wrote, "Indian has dances, foot-tapping melodies by A. R. Rahman and two pretty women, Manisha Koirala and Urmila Matondkar". Both Indian and Hindustani were commercial successes. The film was India's official entry for the Best Foreign Language Film for the Academy Awards in 1996, but was not nominated.

In her last release of the year, she acted in the musical drama Khamoshi: The Musical, which marked Sanjay Leela Bhansali's directorial debut. Koirala played Annie, a caring daughter to her deaf-mute parents Joseph and Flavy, portrayed by Nana Patekar and  Seema Biswas respectively; Salman Khan played Raj, her love interest. In preparation for her role, Koirala learned the Indian Sign Language. A critic from Channel 4 wrote, "Koirala in particular is in her element and demonstrates the full range of her acting ability, rather than playing against it as she has had to do in more traditional films". Despite receiving critical acclaim, Khamoshi: The Musical was a flop. Filmfare included her performance among a list of "80 Iconic Performances" of Indian cinema in 2011. In a box office roundup of the year, The Indian Express felt Koirala put up an "impressive show" with her successes. Her performance in Khamoshi earned her a second Filmfare Award for Best Performance and a nomination for Best Actress. She also received her only win for Best Actress at the Screen Awards.

1997–2003: Widespread recognition 
In 1997, she played the leading role alongside Kajol and Bobby Deol in the thriller Gupt: The Hidden Truth, which was one of the biggest hits that year.

She went on to collaborate once again with the acclaimed director Mani Ratnam, and starred in his film Dil Se.. (1998) opposite Shah Rukh Khan. Her role received similarly good reviews and earned her several award nominations including the Filmfare Best Actress Award nomination. The film proved to be a hit overseas. The film became the first Indian film to enter the top 10 in the United Kingdom box office charts. Even months after its release in September 1998, the film was still screened on five screens, five times per day with an average of 3,000 spectators across all screens in the Cineworld complex in Feltham, West London. The film went on to win the Netpac Award at the Berlin International Film Festival, two National Film Awards, and six Filmfare Awards. The intense political agenda of the film with the trials of the Assamese on the India-China border, the love story and the fact that it coincided with the 50th Independence Anniversary celebrations became a major factor for its success overseas, particularly amongst the South Asian diaspora in the west. Dil Se.. was also hit in Japan. Also she played the leading role opposite to Govinda in the movie Maharaja.

In 1999, she starred in the successful Kuchhe Dhaage, which was followed by six more releases, the most notable of them being Indra Kumar's drama Mann. She played a traffic accident victim in the film, which entered into the top five highest-grossing films of the year. Her performance in the film won her favourable reviews. Film critic M. Ali Ikram wrote about her performance: "If there is a respite for Manisha's innumerable fans of late, this flick is it. We may not care about hits and flops, but it is painful to watch this acting virtuoso in the innumerable side roles she has been seen in of late. Indra Kumar's decision to cast Manisha here is a case of perfect casting, and she never lets him or the audience down. This lady is truly the Meena Kumari of her generation. It is great fun watching Manisha and Aamir Khan's perfect chemistry opposite one another. The film's climax has both stars permanently molding a spot for themselves in Bollywood history, and it will have you shedding tears by the bucketful." It was a successful feature at the box office. While filming Laawaris (1999), Koirala began to get tired of her busy schedule and felt "the pressure getting to [her]"; she turned to alcohol for solace and developed anger issues.

In 2000, she hosted the TV show Sawaal Dus Crore Ka on Zee TV alongside Anupam Kher. In 2001, she starred in the drama Grahan opposite Jackie Shroff. Her portrayal of a rape victim in the film who seeks justice was appreciated, but the film, which was a much-delayed project, was a major commercial failure. After starring in moderately successful Chhupa Rustam: A Musical Thriller she next played the protagonist in Rajkumar Santoshi's drama Lajja, along with an ensemble cast that included Rekha, Anil Kapoor and Madhuri Dixit. The film received a positive reception from critics, and so did Koirala's performance. Her last release of the year was Moksha, opposite Arjun Rampal, which was a failure at the box office.

In 2002, she starred opposite Ajay Devgan in Ram Gopal Verma's Company. The film was a critical success and she won her third Filmfare Critics' Best Actress Award. In that same year, she appeared in Ek Chotisi Love Story. The film, when released, generated tremendous response at the box office, becoming one of the few successes of the year. The movie's release was stayed as she accused the director of the film, Shashilal Nair, of using her body double to shoot some love scenes in the film, and portraying her in bad light by shooting positions using another actress in her place, without her approval. A court finally decided to stay the release of the film.

After years of success, in 2003, she was seen in several low budget films, yet not less challenging roles. She ventured into strong woman-oriented films in 2003, such as Escape From Taliban, which won her the BFJA Award for Best Actress. She then played the protagonist in Market (2003), a film portraying the whole life story of a young prostitute. The film did decently at the box office and was considered 'average.'

2004–2009: Career fluctuations
In 2004, she moved to New York City and earned a diploma in filmmaking from New York University. While living in New York, she became a member of an independent documentary filmmakers' society.
After receiving a diploma in filmmaking, she produced the small-budget caper-comedy Paisa Vasool (2004), in which she starred along with Sushmita Sen; this was probably the first ever chick-flick in Indian cinema in that it did not have a male lead nor a love story. Since then, she has played supporting and leading roles in various unsuccessful films, some of which have been well received by critics, such as the historical epic drama Taj Mahal: An Eternal Love Story (2005), the thriller Tum - A Dangerous Obsession (2005), and the horror film Anjaane – The Unknown (2005).

In Anwar, she played a supporting role along with her brother Siddharth, her only release in 2007. In 2008, she made her comeback to films, with her first leading role since Mumbai Express (2005), in Tulsi, opposite Irrfan Khan. Although before its release, her comeback was described by the media as "shocking", and the film suffered from poor marketing, her performance as Tulsi, a young homemaker diagnosed with leukemia, was well received. Taran Adarsh from IndiaFM wrote: "Manisha Koirala sinks her teeth in this role and delivers a fine performance." She next starred in Sirf (2008). The film was released without any notice or publicity and was a critical and box office failure. Her first Bengali film Khela, directed by Rituparno Ghosh, released the same year, along with the long delayed Hindi film Mehbooba; both films released on the same day.

In December 2009, she served as a jury member in the fifth edition of the Dubai International Film Festival. Her next film was Deepti Naval's directorial debut Do Paise Ki Dhoop, Char Aane Ki Barish which premiered at the market section of the 2009 Cannes Film Festival to a positive response. Later that year, she acted in Partho Ghosh's Ek Second... Jo Zindagi Badal De?.

2010–present: Critical acclaim and current work
On 19 June 2010, Koirala married Samrat Dahal, a Nepali businessman, in a traditional ceremony held in Kathmandu. The couple spent their honeymoon in Finland. They met through the online social networking website Facebook. The couple divorced in 2012.
In 2010, she made her foray into Malayalam cinema with Shyamaprasad's Elektra, a psycho-sensual drama based on Sophocles's ancient Greek tragic play Electra. She plays the antagonist in the film, which revolves around the concept of the Electra complex, which is a daughter's psychosexual competition with her mother for her father's affection. The film premiered at the International Film Festival of India, where it was well received. She also acted in her native Nepali-language film, Dharmaa, after a gap of 22 years since her first film.

She was next seen in director Onir's critically acclaimed anthology film I Am, sharing the screen with Juhi Chawla. Noted film critic Taran Adarsh commented: "It's a delight to watch Juhi and Manisha, after a hiatus. Both deliver striking performances – even getting the language right." In 2011 Koirala appeared in Mappillai, her first Tamil movie in five years. A remake of the 1989 film of the same name, the film saw her reprising the role originally played by Srividya. Her performance earned her a nomination at the Filmfare Award for Best Supporting Actress – Tamil. The film was declared a hit. In 2012, she collaborated with director Ram Gopal Verma for his 3D horror film Bhoot Returns, a sequel to the 2003 hit Bhoot.

On 29 November 2012, media news reported that Koirala had been diagnosed with ovarian cancer. She had no clue about the disease until she felt very weak, and went to a hospital in Kathmandu with her brother. She flew to India and was admitted to Jaslok Hospital in Mumbai. She then flew to the US for treatment, however the exact ailment was not disclosed. On 10 December, she underwent surgery. The following day it was reported that the surgery had been successful. She had to undergo chemotherapy and spent months at the hospital in New York. As of 2 May 2017, she had been cancer-free for four years. After fighting cancer and winning the battle, she is actively involved in spreading awareness about the disease.

By mid-2014, the actress was cancer-free. In 2015, her much delayed psychological thriller Chehere: A Modern Day Classic (2015) released.

Koirala silently returned with a Kannada- Tamil, mystery film Game where she portrayed the main female lead. Her official Bollywood comeback was with the drama Dear Maya (2017). Directed by Sunaina Bhatnagar and co-starring Madiha Imam, her role was of a middle-aged lonely woman who embarks on a journey to find love when she receives love letters. The film received mixed reviews from critics with praise directed to Koirala's performance. Sweta Kaushal of Hindustan Times said: "Manisha Koirala shines like a diamond in a coal mine." Suhani Singh from India Today noted that she is the "star in this mawkish coming-of-age story", while Stutee Ghosh of The Quint wrote that "Manisha Koirala's grace makes it worth a watch."

The next year, Koirala starred in the Netflix anthology Lust Stories. The film, a sequel to the 2013 film Bombay Talkies, featured her in one of the segments directed by Dibakar Banerji. She played a middle-aged housewife, having an extra-marital affair with her husband's best friend. The film was nominated for International Emmy Award for Best TV Movie or Miniseries. Koirala's performance was also, appreciated. This was followed by an appearance in Rajkumar Hirani's biography Sanju, based on the life of actor Sanjay Dutt; Koirala portrayed the role of actress Nargis, Dutt's mother. The film emerged as the highest-grossing film of the year. She later featured in  Prasthanam Hindi remake of the political thriller with  same title, in which she played as Sanjay Dutt's wife and much delayed film Do Paise Ki Dhoop, Chaar Aane Ki Baarish released on Netflix this year.

In 2020, she appeared in Netflix original film titled Maska, directed by Neeraj Udhwani.

In 2021, she is appeared in AR Rahman's romantic musical 99 Songs. She then starred in an American comedy film India Sweets and Spices, directed by Geeta Malik. The film is based on Geeta Malik's own script “Dinner With Friends” that won the 2016 Academy Nicholl Fellowships in screen-writing.

Off-screen work 

Koirala is actively involved in social work, specifically working with organisations to promote women's rights, prevention of violence against women, and also to prevent the human trafficking of Nepali girls for prostitution.
In September 1999, she was appointed as a UNFPA Goodwill Ambassador for India. Koirala has advocated the need for an official Earth Anthem for the planet supporting the efforts of Indian poet-diplomat Abhay K in this direction.

In May 2013, after her cancer treatment, Koirala said she intends to use her celebrity status and personal story to inspire others who are battling the dreaded disease. "All I want to do from now onwards is to be useful to people who could need [a] little advice," she said in her first interview since undergoing cancer treatment at Memorial Sloan-Kettering Cancer Centre. She has become a motivational speaker after her battle with cancer, and gives talks on various topics at schools, hospitals and organisations.

She was appointed as a UNFPA Goodwill Ambassador for Nepal in 2015 and was involved in the relief works after the Nepal earthquake 2015.

She gave speeches in 2016 on "Transformation" at Mercedes-Benz India in Pune, and on "Importance of Being Mindful Living" at Cipla in Goa. She was scheduled to speakon "Health is Our Responsibility" at Sneh Foundation  in February 2017; on "Cancer is Conquerable" at Apollo Hospitals in Hyderabad; and on "My Life's Lesson" at Shiv Nadar Foundation in Chennai; on "Why Celebrities Need Coaching" in Delhi; on "Woman Empowerment" at National Women's Parliament in Vijayawada; and on "Gifts of Cancer" at TEDx Jaipur.

In 2017, she was appointed as Goodwill Ambassador by Nepal’s Ministry of Urban Development for Bagmati Cleanup Mega Campaign aimed at cleaning the Bagmati River.

She has contributed as a co-writer to a book: Healed, the story of her battle against ovarian cancer.

In 2020, she launched "Manisha Koirala Cancer Education Fund" with the support of Global College International, Kathmandu to give educational scholarships to children of cancer victim or survivors with poor financial background. Her social activism and achievements in movies has made her one of the most famous Nepalis in the world.

In 2022 Nepalese general election, she supported the pro-monarchy Rashtriya Prajatantra Party.

Accolades

Awards and nominations

Honours and recognition 

 1994, Priyadarshini Academy - Smita Patil Memorial Award
 1999, United Nations Population Fund - Goodwill Ambassador for India
 2001, Order of Gorkha Dakshina Bahu Honoured by the Government of Nepal for achievement in the Indian Film Industry
 2003, 1st Non-Resident Nepali Conference, Kathmandu - Letter of Felicitation presented by King of Nepal
 2006, World Hindu Federation - Letter of Appreciation
 2014, India Today Woman Summit- Woman of the Year Award
 2015, London Indian Film Festival - Spirit of Inspiration Award
 2015, Global Officials of Dignity Award - Nepal's Humanitarian Ambassador
 2015, United Nations Population Fund - Goodwill Ambassador for Nepal
 2017, Jury Mention - Brave and Beautiful Performance for Dear Maya
 2017, Navbharat Times Award for Contribution to Indian Cinema
 2018, Muscat International Film Festival, Oman - Felicitation by Oman Film Society
 2018, Most Versatile Actress in Indian Cinema
 2019, Mahindra Udaya Festival - Excellence in Social Cause
 2019, Society Pride of India Honour
 2022, Spandan Global Indo-Nepal Art Festival, Kathmandu  - Lifetime Achievement Award
 2022, Garhwal Post Silver Jubilee Awards - Lifetime Achievement Award presented by the Governor of Maharashtra

Filmography

References

External links

 
 

Living people
1970 births
Actors from Kathmandu
Actresses from Mumbai
Nepalese film actresses
Nepalese television actresses
Nepalese expatriate actresses in India
Actresses in Hindi cinema
Actresses in Telugu cinema
Actresses in Tamil cinema
Actresses in Bengali cinema
Actresses in Malayalam cinema
Actresses in Kannada cinema
Actresses in Nepali cinema
Order of Gorkha Dakshina Bahu
Screen Awards winners
Tamil Nadu State Film Awards winners
Filmfare Awards winners
Filmfare Awards South winners
M
Members of the Order of Gorkha Dakshina Bahu
Nepalese film producers
Nepalese women film producers
Bahun
Khas people
20th-century Nepalese actresses
21st-century Nepalese actresses